King Wen may refer to:

King Wen of Zhou (died 1050 BC)
King Wen of Chu (died 677 BC)
Wu Rui (died 202 BC), King Wen of Changsha
Zhao Mo (died 122 BC), King Wen of Nanyue
Mun of Balhae
Zheng Jing

See also
Duke Wen (disambiguation)
Emperor Wen (disambiguation)